Komaran is a 1982 Indian Malayalam-language film, directed by J. C. George and produced by Prabhakaran Thattiriyattu. The film stars Jayan, Mammootty, Nedumudi Venu and Beena . The film has musical score by Kottayam Joy.

Cast

Jayan
Mammootty as Babu
Nedumudi Venu
Beena
Sreenivasan
Kalaranjini
Balan K. Nair
C. C. Varghese
Jalaja
Kundara Johny
Lalithasree
Mala Aravindan
Raji
Ravi Menon
Seema

Soundtrack
The music was composed by Kottayam Joy and the lyrics were written by Trichur Biju.

References

External links
 

1982 films
1980s Malayalam-language films